Russia Wharf is a completed high-rise building in downtown Boston, Massachusetts. The building rises  and contains 32 floors. Construction began in 2006 and was finished in early 2011; as such, the structure is one of the most recently completed high-rises in the city. Russia Wharf now stands as the 31st-tallest building in the city. The architectural firm that designed the building is Childs Bertman Tseckares Inc., of Boston, Massachusetts. The civil engineer, also responsible for managing permitting (including Chapter 91 Licensing) was Vanasse Hangen Brustlin, Inc. of Watertown, Massachusetts. From about 1897 to 2007, the site contained three low-rise mercantile buildings called the Russia, Graphic Arts, and Tufts Buildings. The office tower is being constructed on the site of the Graphic Arts and Tufts Buildings. As of 2009, Boston Properties has begun to refer to the building as Atlantic Wharf.

The project was controversial because of the historic nature of the buildings and their prominent position on the edge of Fort Point Channel. The result was that the "Russia Building" fronting on Atlantic Avenue was retained in its entirety and the south and east facing historic brick facades of the Graphic Arts and Tufts Buildings were retained and restored. The building rises 32 stories above the street and extends 6 stories below.

In the fall of 2009, the project created additional controversy when its developer, Boston Properties, was accused by The Boston Harbor Association of reneging on public space requirements which Boston Properties agreed to in exchange for being allowed to exceed height restrictions.  The building opened in January 2011 and boasts multiple ground floor restaurants, an art gallery, multi-media center, channel concierges and is the new home of the Boston Society of Architects' BSA Space, all available to the public. This is the first LEED platinum high-rise in Boston.

See also
List of tallest buildings in Boston
Russia Wharf Buildings

References

External links
Entry on Emporis
Russia Wharf Condo Development
Boston Business Journal
Boston Properties' entry on Atlantic Wharf 
Longleaf Lumber Salvages Heart Pine Beams for Russia Wharf

Skyscraper office buildings in Boston
Office buildings completed in 2011
Residential buildings completed in 2011
Residential skyscrapers in Boston
Skyscraper hotels in Boston